Road signs in Bangladesh are similar to those used in some parts of the United Kingdom, except that they are multilingual.

Regulatory signs

Warning signs

Indication signs

Additional signs

Traffic signals

External links
 

Bangladesh
Road transport in Bangladesh